David Patrick (born 21 February 1976) is an Australian college basketball coach who is the head coach for the Sacramento State Hornets men's basketball team. He is the former head coach of the UC Riverside Highlanders men's basketball team. He is the godfather of NBA player Ben Simmons.

Playing career
Born in Bermuda, and raised in Melbourne, Australia, Patrick arrived stateside in 1994, enrolling at Chapel Trafton High School in Baton Rouge, Louisiana, where he was district MVP and First Team All-Parish, while also being selected to play in the Louisiana State High School All-Star Game. In addition, Patrick continued to compete for Australia at the youth national level.

Patrick attended Syracuse for one season where he was part of the Orange's 1996 NCAA tournament Final Four team, before transferring to play his remaining three years of eligibility at Southwestern Louisiana (later Louisiana–Lafayette).

After college, Patrick returned to Australia where he played professionally for one season with the Canberra Cannons of the National Basketball League, and also had stops in England with the Chester Jets, and in Spain with Castellion before taking up coaching.

Coaching career

College
Patrick's first stop as an Assistant was at Nicholls State University, where he worked for head coach JP Piper. In 2006 Patrick joined Saint Mary's College During his time at Saint Mary's they made multiple NCAA tournaments, including a 2010 NCAA Sweet 16 appearance. In four seasons at St Mary's the team went 98-35 and compiled 2 NCAA Tournaments and an NIT Quarterfinal berth. In 2012, Patrick joined the staff of LSU under Johnny Jones, where he was pivotal in bringing Ben Simmons, his godson, to the Tigers. During his time at LSU they made the 2014 NIT, and 2015 NCAA Tournament where they eventually lost to North Carolina State 66–65. Patrick spent four seasons at LSU where the team went 80-51 during that span.

After four seasons at LSU, Patrick joined Jamie Dixon's staff at TCU in 2016. In 2017 they were NIT Champions for the first time in school history. In 2018 the school reached the NCAA Tournament for the first time in 20 years.

On 14 March 2018, Patrick was named the head coach at UC Riverside. His inaugural season saw the Highlanders break several program records including 279 three-point shots culminating in a .379 three-point shooting percentage which was the best in the Big West Conference and top 30 (28th) in the nation. In 2019-20 UC Riverside won 17 games which is tied for the most Division 1 wins in school history. They started the season with a 66–47 win at the University of Nebraska–Lincoln in the Big Ten Conference The team finished 8th Nationally in Scoring Defense 60.6ppg, and 1st in the Big West.  The season was cut short on 10 March, due to concerns over the coronavirus pandemic. In his two years at UC Riverside, Patrick currently holds the best 2-year start in school history.

On July 1, 2020, Patrick joined the staff of Eric Musselman as the associate head coach at Arkansas.

International
Patrick was named as an assistant coach in 2019 to the Australian men's national basketball team.  The team competed in the 2019 FIBA World Cup, where they made it to the semifinals, eventually finishing 4th. Patrick was also named to the staff of the Australian national team for the 2020 Summer Olympics. However, he was later replaced by John Rillie due to an Achilles injury.

Head coaching record

References

1976 births
Living people
Arkansas Razorbacks men's basketball coaches
Australian expatriate basketball people in the United States
Australian men's basketball coaches
Australian men's basketball players
Canberra Cannons players
Cheshire Jets players
College men's basketball head coaches in the United States
Louisiana Ragin' Cajuns men's basketball players
LSU Tigers basketball coaches
Nicholls Colonels men's basketball coaches
Saint Mary's Gaels men's basketball coaches
Syracuse Orange men's basketball players
TCU Horned Frogs men's basketball coaches
UC Riverside Highlanders men's basketball coaches
Bermudian emigrants to Australia
Australian expatriate basketball people in the United Kingdom
Australian expatriate sportspeople in England
Australian people of Caribbean descent
Basketball players from Melbourne
Sportsmen from Victoria (Australia)
Australian expatriate basketball people in Spain